Roy and Edna Disney CalArts Theater (REDCAT) is an interdisciplinary contemporary arts center for innovative visual, performing and media arts in downtown Los Angeles, located inside the Walt Disney Concert Hall complex. Opened in November 2003 as an extension of CalArts in Los Angeles.

Programs

 Visual Arts
 Performing Arts
 Film/Video
 Music
 Conversations

Facility

The art center consists of a  gallery space with revolving exhibitions, a 200–270-seat flexible black box theater, and a lounge cafe/bar and a bookstore.

History

As the Walt Disney Concert Hall came under construction in 1992, Roy E. Disney, son of Roy O. and Edna Disney, saw an opportunity for the California Institute of the Arts (CalArts) in Santa Clarita to have a presence in downtown Los Angeles. With the approval of The Walt Disney Company's Board of Directors and support from the County of Los Angeles, the project's lead architect, Frank Gehry, whose children also graduated from CalArts, was tasked to design the new venue. Roy Disney and his wife Patty personally matched the Disney Company gift for REDCAT's construction and, to extend the memory of Roy O. Disney who built The Walt Disney Company with Walt and oversaw the construction of CalArts' campus, dedicated the new art center to his parents' name. CalArts President Steven D. Lavine cites the pairing of high caliber renegade experimentation and a social space for artist-community engagement, especially those in London (e.g. The Cottesloe Theatre as part of the Royal National Theatre), as a pointed consideration for the venue design and its conception as an institutional laboratory.

Mark Murphy was recruited as executive director of REDCAT. He observed a dearth of interdisciplinary art spaces in Los Angeles the likes of Yerba Buena Center for the Arts, Wexner Center for the Arts, and the Walker Art Center, or the Alte Oper in Frankfurt and the Hebbel am Ufer in Berlin. This impetus propelled initiatives for commissioned works, artist residencies, collaborations, and public programs. Since 2020, João Ribas is the Steven D. Lavine Executive Director of REDCAT & Vice President for Cultural Partnerships.

Harvey Lichtenstein, president and executive producer of the Brooklyn Academy of Music, was brought in as a consultant during the development phases of REDCAT during 1999.

In the 2002 architecture book Gehry: The City and Music, Jeremy Gilbert-Rolfe, a former faculty member at CalArts, describes REDCAT as a performance space located within the parking-lot structure of the Walt Disney Concert Hall. Gilbert-Rolfe notes that REDCAT's exterior stone appearance makes it visually distinct from the metallic exterior of the Walt Disney Concert Hall complex. He uses this comparison to illustrate the social divide between artists performing at REDCAT versus those performing at the Walt Disney Concert Hall. Gilbert-Rolfe suggests that REDCAT can be seen as an entry-level venue for aspiring artistic professionals looking to perform at more well-known venues like the Walt Disney Concert Hall. It is worth noting that Gilbert-Rolfe's analysis was published prior to REDCAT's inaugural season in the fall of 2003.

In 2007, Los Angeles-based art critic Edward Goldman found himself driving by REDCAT and decided to see if there was an exhibition on display. Upon arrival, he noticed that the gallery did not use banners to announce their shows. Despite this, he took a chance and entered the galley. As the only person in the gallery, he noticed the art exhibit’s attendant appearing ambivalent to him as he entered the gallery. Noticing an exhibit on display, Goldman found the installation Falha (Failure) by Brazilian artist Renata Lucas to be austere, and there were no labels or wall text to explain the artwork.  Uncertain if visitors were supposed to engage with the artwork, Goldman took a risk and walked across the plywood sheets (contents of the artist’s exhibit). Luckily, he discovered a pamphlet with an essay about the artist, but it was written in dense, inaccessible jargon, as he described it to be “favored by ArtForum magazine and the CalArts in-crowd”.  Seeking clarity, he asked the young attendant for help, who explained that Lucas wanted visitors to have a hands-on experience with her artwork. Despite this, Goldman determined that the exhibition's curator Clara Kim did not clearly communicate this intention to the public. Afterwards, Goldman left the exhibition with the impression of feeling like an “uninvited guest crashing the party”.  In a 2013 TEDTalk, Goldman disclosed that WDCH's architect Gehry was the first art professional he met in Los Angeles when he initially immigrated to the United States. 

The performances at REDCAT are funded and presented in part by The REDCAT Council. Current council members include: Diane Levine (Chair), Edgar D. Arceneaux, Joseph M. Cohen, Rita Cohen, Neda Disney, Tim Disney, Fariba Ghaffari, Richard J. Grad, R. Stephen Maguire, Antonio Mejias-Rentas, Seth Polen, Kevin Ratner, Abby Sher, Michael Skloff, Alex Westerman, Adele Yellin and Ravi Rajan, (President, CalArts).

References

External links
 The Politics of Culture: The REDCAT Theater
 Mark Murphy & David Sefton: Two LA Impresarios

Theatres in Los Angeles
Art museums and galleries in Los Angeles
Arts centers in California
California Institute of the Arts
Event venues established in 2003
Art galleries established in 2003
2003 establishments in California
Tourist attractions in Los Angeles
Bunker Hill, Los Angeles
Downtown Los Angeles